The BSSN formalism is a formalism of general relativity that was developed by Thomas W. Baumgarte, Stuart L. Shapiro, Masaru Shibata and Takashi Nakamura between 1987 and 1999. It is a modification of the ADM formalism developed during the 1950s.

The ADM formalism is a Hamiltonian formalism that does not permit stable and long-term numerical simulations. In the BSSN formalism, the ADM equations are modified by introducing auxiliary variables. The formalism has been tested for a long-term evolution of linear gravitational waves and used for a variety of purposes such as simulating the non-linear evolution of gravitational waves or the evolution and collision of black holes.

See also
ADM formalism
Canonical coordinates
Canonical gravity
Hamiltonian mechanics

References 

Mathematical methods in general relativity
Formalism (deductive)